Chad Quenneville is an American retired ice hockey center who was a two-time All-American for Providence.

Career
Quenneville began attending Providence College in the fall of 1991 and immediately began producing for the Friars. He was nearly a point per game player in each of his first two seasons and then led Providence in scoring as a junior. He increased his production as a senior, again leading the Friars in scoring, and was named an All-American in each of his final two years with the program. While Quenneville was productive offensively, he couldn't help Providence win many games on the ice. The Friars' record declined for three years and held flat in his final year. He was, however, able to lead Providence to a surprising run to the Hockey East championship game. 

After finishing up his college career, Quenneville began playing professionally with a small stint for two teams at the AAA level. He soon found a home in the ECHL, becoming a high-scoring forward for the Pensacola Ice Pilots. Quenneville led the team to the semifinals in 1997 and the Kelly Cup finals the following year. After leading Pensacola in scoring for the second time in 1999, Quenneville retired from the game.

He was inducted in the Providence Athletic Hall of Fame in 2016.

Statistics

Regular season and playoffs

Awards and honors

References

External links

1972 births
Living people
AHCA Division I men's ice hockey All-Americans
American men's ice hockey centers
Ice hockey players from Massachusetts
People from South Hadley, Massachusetts
Providence Friars men's ice hockey players
Albany River Rats players
Atlanta Knights players
Nashville Knights players
Pensacola Ice Pilots players